The Ian Potter Centre: NGV Australia is an art gallery that houses the Australian part of the art collection of the National Gallery of Victoria (NGV).

The Ian Potter Centre: NGV Australia is located at Federation Square in Melbourne, Victoria; while the gallery's international works are displayed at the NGV International on St Kilda Road. It should not be confused with the Ian Potter Museum of Art operated by the University of Melbourne.

Collection

There are over 20,000 Australian artworks, including paintings, sculpture, prints, photography, fashion and textiles, and the collection is one of the oldest and most well known in the country.

The Ian Potter Centre is a legacy of the businessman and philanthropist Sir Ian Potter. Well-known works at the Ian Potter Centre include Frederick McCubbin's The pioneer (1904) and Tom Roberts' Shearing the Rams (1890). Also featured are works from Sidney Nolan, Arthur Boyd, Albert Tucker, Arthur Streeton, John Perceval, Margaret Preston, Bill Henson, Howard Arkley and Fred Williams.

Indigenous art includes works by William Barak and Emily Kngwarreye.

Building design

The design of the Ian Potter Centre was commissioned to Lab Architecture Studio in association with Bates Smart of Melbourne, headed by Peter Davidson and Donald Bates. Their work has since earned them The RAIA National Award for Interior Architecture as well as the Marion Mahony Interior Architecture Award. According to the Australian Institute of Architects:

See also

List of museums in Melbourne

References

External links
 National Gallery of Victoria
 NGV Collection: Australian Art
 The Ian Potter Centre: NGV Australia at FedSquare

Art museums and galleries in Melbourne
Buildings and structures in Melbourne City Centre

fr:National Gallery of Victoria#Ian Potter Centre et NGV International